Alyssa Jazmine Oviedo Reyes (born 18 August 2000) is an American-born Dominican footballer who plays as a midfielder for the Vermont Catamounts and the Dominican Republic national team.

Raised in Clifton, New Jersey, Ovideo played prep soccer at DePaul Catholic High School.

International career
Oviedo was born in the United States to a Peruvian father and a Dominican mother, and as such was eligible to represent either of these three nations.

She was the most outstanding player for the Dominican Republic at the 2018 CONCACAF Women's U-20 Championship qualification, scoring six goals. On 5 May 2018, she played officially at senior level, becoming cap-tied to the Dominican Republic.

International goals
Scores and results list Dominican Republic's goal tally first

References 

2000 births
Living people
Citizens of the Dominican Republic through descent
DePaul Catholic High School alumni
Dominican Republic women's footballers
Women's association football midfielders
Women's association football forwards
Dominican Republic women's international footballers
Dominican Republic people of Peruvian descent
Sportspeople from Clifton, New Jersey
Soccer players from New Jersey
American women's soccer players
Vermont Catamounts women's soccer players
American sportspeople of Peruvian descent
American sportspeople of Dominican Republic descent